Corporal Nathaniel M. Allen (April 20, 1840 — July 30, 1900) was a United States soldier who fought in the American Civil War. Nathaniel was awarded the Medal of Honor - the United States' highest award for bravery during combat - for his actions at the Battle of Gettysburg. He was presented the award in 1899, a year before he died.

Early life
Nathaniel was born in Boston, Massachusetts on April 20, 1840. His father Gaius Allen, who came from Acton, was a former soldier who served in the Davis Blues Regiment during the War of 1812. As a young man, Nathaniel worked in Boston as a watchmaker. When the civil war broke out on April 12, 1861, he immediately enlisted into the 1st Regiment Massachusetts Volunteer Infantry as a Private, on May 22, 1861, aged 21. In April 1862, he was promoted to Corporal of the Color Guard and maintained the rank for the rest of his military career.

Battle of Gettysburg
The Battle of Gettysburg started on July 1, 1863 and was fought until July 3, 1863. It was considered the turning point in the Civil War. It also created the highest number of casualties of the Civil War, with 23,055 Union troops killed, missing in action or wounded; and 23,231 Confederate casualties.

Allen's battle started on July 2, one day into the battle. In the afternoon of that day, his regiment came under heavy small-arms fire from advancing Confederate infantry. In the midst of the fight, he was given the Regiment's U.S. flag from his wounded ensign William Eaton. Allen's commander then ordered the regiment to retreat from the advancing Confederates. Whilst retreating, Allen saw Sergeant William Kelren shot and killed - dropping the regimental flag beneath him. Allen immediately retrieved the flag from underneath Kelren’s body. He then ran back to his retreating regiment carrying both flags safely from the battlefield. It was for this action he was awarded the Medal of Honor. More than half of Allen’s regiment were killed or wounded in the battle.

Later years

After the Civil War ended, Nathaniel returned to Boston where he continued his old trade as a watchmaker. Several years later, however, Nathaniel's eyesight began to fail, making it impossible to work as a watchmaker. He then moved in with his sisters in South Acton, where he lived for the rest of his life. Nathaniel was awarded his medal of honor on 29 March 1899. 36 years after the Battle of Gettysburg. Of the 1,527 Medals of Honor awarded for action in the Civil War, more than half were for capturing the flag of an enemy force or preventing one’s own flag from being captured. He died from nervous exhaustion and heart disease a year later on July 30, 1900, at age 60. He was buried in Woodlawn Cemetery in Acton.

See also

 List of Medal of Honor recipients for the Battle of Gettysburg
 List of American Civil War Medal of Honor recipients: A–F

Notes

Bibliography

External links
 

1840 births
1900 deaths
People from Boston
People of Massachusetts in the American Civil War
Union Army soldiers
United States Army Medal of Honor recipients
American Civil War recipients of the Medal of Honor
People from Acton, Massachusetts